The 1962 United States Senate election in Washington was held on November 6, 1962. Incumbent Democratic U.S. Senator Warren Magnuson won a fourth term in office, narrowly defeating Republican nominee Richard G. Christensen.

Blanket primary
The blanket primary was held on September 18, 1962.

Candidates

Democratic
Warren G. Magnuson, incumbent United States Senator
John "Hugo Frye" Patric, writer

Republican
Richard G. Christensen, Lutheran minister
Ben Larson, teacher

Results

General election

Candidates
 Warren Magnuson, Democratic, incumbent U.S. Senator
 Richard G. Christensen, Republican
 W. Frank Horne, Constitution, candidate for Washington's 6th congressional district in 1958
 Henry M. Killman, Socialist Labor, perennial candidate

Results

See also 
 1962 United States Senate elections

References

Bibliography
 
 

1962
United States Senate
Washington